Mistress of the Apes is a 1979 film from Larry Buchanan.

Plot
After losing her baby, anthropologist's wife Susan Jamison heads an expedition to Africa to find her missing husband. There she discovers a group of ape men who decide to adopt her as their queen.

Cast
 Jenny Neumann as Susan Jamison
 Barbara Leigh as Laura Thurston
 Garth Pillsbury as Paul Cory
 Walt Robin as David Thurston
 Stuart Lancaster as Brady
 Mark Rhudy as Matthews
 Marius Mazmanian as Sikes
 Suzy Mandel as Secretary

Reception 
TV Guide panned the film, rating it one star and writing "The farfetched premise makes for some pretty entertaining moments, including some unintentionally funny philosophical meandering." Writing in the Independent Critic, Richard Propes described the film as "fairly close to dreadful" and "so bad that it's highlight would have to be the Tom Jones like vocals [...] that's sort of a cross between tribal rhythms and Vegas lounge."

References

External links

Mistress of the Apes at TCMDB
Mistress of the Apes at BFI
Review of film at Horrorview
Review of film at Theatre of Guts

1979 films
1970s adventure films
American adventure films
Films directed by Larry Buchanan
1970s English-language films
1970s American films